Seal Island is located near Ravensthorpe in the Great Southern region of Western Australia.

References

Islands of the Great Southern (Western Australia)